Acidovorax delafieldii is a Gram-negative soil bacterium. It belongs to Comamonadaceae.

References

External links
Type strain of Acidovorax delafieldii at BacDive -  the Bacterial Diversity Metadatabase

Comamonadaceae
Bacteria described in 1990